Marquis Jurell Wright (born July 5, 1995) is an American professional basketball player for Samsunspor of the Turkish Basketball First League. He played college basketball for Siena College before playing professionally in Hungary, Israel, Romania, France, Dominican Republic and Turkey.

Early life and college career
Wright attended North Point High School in Waldorf, Maryland, where he averaged 16.6 points, 6.1 assists, 4.7 rebounds and 3.9 steals, leading the Eagles to a 24–3 record and a state semifinal appearance as a senior.

On March 21, 2013, Wright was named co-Maryland Gatorade Player of the Year, alongside Kris Jenkins.

Wright played college basketball for Siena College's Saints. On February 13, 2017, Wright recorded a college career-high 36 points, shooting 6-of-11 from 3-point range, along with three assists in an 82–102 loss to Monmouth.

In his senior year at Siena, Wright averaged 16.8 points, 4.1 rebounds and 5 assists and 1.1 steals per game and led the Saints to the MAAC Tournament Championship Game for the first time in seven years. Wright finished his college career as the third all-time at Siena in assists (614), fifth in steals (199) and 10th in points (1,546).

On February 27, 2017, Wright earned a spot in the All-MAAC Second-team.

Professional career

Egis Körmend (2017–2018)
On July 18, 2017, Wright started his professional career with the Hungarian team Egis Körmend, signing a one-year deal. On December 2, 2017, Wright participated in the 2018 Hungarian League All-Star Game. On March 17, 2018, Wright recorded a season-high 24 points, shooting 8-of-11 from the field, along with nine rebounds and five assists in a 77–72 win over Szedeák.

In 48 games played during the 2017–18 season (played in the FIBA Europe Cup and the Hungarian League), Wright averaged 11.7 points, 4.1 rebounds, 4.7 assists and 1.1 steals per game. Wright led Körmend to the 2018 Hungarian League Playoffs as the fourth seed, but they eventually were eliminated by Szolnoki Olaj in the Semifinals.

Maccabi Rishon LeZion (2018)
On August 17, 2018, Wright signed with the Israeli team Maccabi Rishon LeZion for the 2018–19 season. In October 2018, Wright won the 2018 Israeli League Cup with Rishon LeZion after averaging 10.7 points and 4.2 assists in the tournament. However, on November 26, 2018, Wright parted ways with Rishon LeZion after appearing in seven Israeli League games.

Denain Voltaire (2019–2020)
On July 25, 2019, Wright signed a one-year deal with Denain Voltaire of the French LNB Pro B. In 23 games, he averaged 12.2 points, 2.8 rebounds, 5.9 assists and 1.3 steals per game.

Prienai (2020–2021)
On July 24, 2020, Wright signed with CBet Prienai of the Lithuanian Basketball League.

Boulazac (2021)
After a brief stint in Romania with CS Universitatea Cluj-Napoca, Wright signed with Boulazac Basket Dordogne of the LNB Pro B on August 14, 2021.

Alliance Sport Alsace (2021–2022)
On November 7, 2021, Wright signed with Alliance Sport Alsace of the LNB Pro B.

Leones de Santo Domingo (2022)
On July 5, 2022, Wright signed with Leones de Santo Domingo of the Liga Nacional de Baloncesto.

Samsun BŞB Anakent Spor Kulübü (2022-2023)
On August 30, 2022, Wright signed with Samsun BŞB Anakent Spor Kulübü of the Turkish Basketball First League.

References

External links
 Siena bio
 RealGM profile
 FIBA profile

1995 births
Living people
American expatriate basketball people in Hungary
American expatriate basketball people in Israel
American expatriate basketball people in France
American men's basketball players
Basketball players from Maryland
BC Körmend players
BC Prienai players
Maccabi Rishon LeZion basketball players
People from Waldorf, Maryland
Point guards
Siena Saints men's basketball players